Road signs in Kyrgyzstan are similar to the road sign system of other post-Soviet states (e.g. Kazakhstan) that ensure that transport vehicles move safely and orderly, as well as to inform the participants of traffic built-in graphic icons. These icons are governed by the Vienna Convention on Road Traffic and Vienna Convention on Road Signs and Signals.

Road signs

References
http://www.adcidl.com/pdf/Kyrgyzstan-Road-Traffic-Signs.pdf

Kyrgyzstan